Live at Sweet Basil Volume 1 is an album by David Murray released on the Italian Black Saint label in 1984 and the first to feature his Big Band. It features performances by Murray, Olu Dara, Baikida Carroll, Craig Harris, Bob Stewart, Vincent Chancey, Steve Coleman, John Purcell, Rod Williams, Fred Hopkins and Billy Higgins conducted by Lawrence "Butch" Morris. The album was followed by Live at Sweet Basil Volume 2.

Reception
The Allmusic review by Scott Yanow awarded the album 3 stars, stating, "The David Murray Big Band tends to be a bit undisciplined, with plenty of rambunctious and overcrowded ensembles... The Dixieland-esque structures are better understood by some of the musicians than others, and this performance is quite erratic but certainly memorable".

Track listing
All compositions by David Murray
 "Lovers" – 8:20  
 "Bechet's Bounce" – 12:05  
 "Silence" – 5:55  
 "Duet for Big Band" – 16:10  
Recorded live in concert at Sweet Basil, NYC, August 24–26, 1984

Personnel
David Murray: tenor saxophone, bass clarinet
Olu Dara: cornet
Baikida Carroll: trumpet
Craig Harris: trombone
Bob Stewart: tuba
Vincent Chancey: flugelhorn
Steve Coleman: soprano saxophone, alto saxophone
John Purcell: alto saxophone, clarinet
Rod Williams: piano
Fred Hopkins: bass
Billy Higgins: percussion
Lawrence "Butch" Morris: conductor

References

1984 live albums
David Murray (saxophonist) live albums
Black Saint/Soul Note live albums